The Golden Virgin, which is also known as The Leaning Virgin is a gilded sculpture the depicts the Virgin Mary offering up Baby Jesus skyward. The sculpture stands atop the  Basilica of Our Lady of Brebières, a Catholic Church in Albert, France. It was sculpted by Albert Roze and was nearly toppled by shellfire in the 1916 Battle of the Somme. It became a symbol of resilience and a great visual icon during World War I. The original statue was damaged and leaning in 1915, and went missing after it fell in 1918 as a result of a British bombardment.  The statue's destruction was elevated to mythical proportions. The anticipated toppling of the statue was superstitiously ascribed as having an effect on the outcome of the war. It was later recast and replaced.

Materials
The Golden Virgin sculpture was covered with thousands of gold leaves. Pope Leo XIII christened the church and seeing the Golden Virgin, he called the basilica the “Lourdes of the North”. The sculpture was fastened to the bell tower.  In 1915, it was leaning after 2000 shells hit the town and Basilica.  Engineers fastened a chain to prevent it from toppling.

Background 

In 1915, during The Battle of the Somme of World War I, the Golden Virgin sculpture was shelled and left leaning at an angle of more than 90 degrees to the vertical axis.

In 1914. German forces suspected a French observation post was housed in the church's bell tower] so from in October 1914 they shelled the dome. By January 7, 1915, the dome was destroyed and by January 21, 1915, the base of the statue was hit and the statue "tilted alarmingly". The sculpture was designed by French sculptor Albert Roze in 1897 and it was placed atop the Basilique Notre-Dame de Brebières. The sculpture depicts a golden-colored Virgin Mary holding the infant Christ high above her head. Although artillery shells destroyed much of the town of Albert, the statue of Mary remained attached to the Basilica but was tilted at an extreme angle.

Superstitious soldiers studied the sculpture daily; they wrote about it in their diaries and remarked it was knocked over and threatening to fall at any time. Messages about the statue were passed between troops; it was often said to be a portent; “When the Virgin falls, the war will end”. Soldiers also said whoever knocked down the statue would lose the war.

The statue became a symbol to British and German troops; soldiers remarked the Virgin Mary was keeping the baby Christ from falling. By 1918, German troops occupied the city of Albert and the British shelled the Basilique to deprive the Germans of the elevated position, and the statue was toppled. It was never recovered.  Coincidentally, WWI ended November 11, 1918.

According to a report:
It was the tradition of the French peasants that when the Virgin fell the war would come to an end.  It is said that an Australian gunner finally brought it down.  At any rate, when the Germans were beaten back at end end of the last Allied offensive and Albert was retaken, the tower and statute had fallen in ruins.  The peasants believe that the luck of the Germans had deserted them when the Virgin of Albert fell.  From that day the power of the enemy waned, and this leaning statue certainly marked the high tide of the German invasion.

Residents discussed placing the sculpture in its famous war-time pose but later decided to place it in its original standing pose. The sculpture of the Golden Virgin was recast in 1929 and fitted atop the  bell tower during the reconstruction of the Basilica.

A photograph of leaning statue was a fascination for many; it appeared on many postcards of the time. The actions of French engineers who shored it up continue to be a source of amazement. Over 100 years later, it remains a symbol of the triumph of good over evil.  It is a landmark and a tourist attraction. and an artistic inspiration.

The events surrounding the church and its sculpture are the subject of Henry Williamson's 1957 novel The Golden Virgin; Volume 6 of the series A Chronicle of Ancient Sunlight. It was selected as a Daily Mail Book of the Month.

Celebrations
On September 8, a novena is celebrated to honor the Leaning Virgin.

See also
 Basilique Notre-Dame de Brebières French Wikipedia
 Christian symbolism
 Golden Madonna of Essen
 Mariology
 Monument
 Religious art
 Roman Catholic Marian art
 Sculpture

References

Notes

Citations
,

Bibliogaphy

External links

Item MM 120230 Photograph - Damage to Golden Virgin, Albert, France, Sergeant John Lord, World War I, 1917 Victoria and Albert Museum
Visit Somme website
WW1 Landmarks: The Leaning Virgin, Albert Photograph
Stock photograph, The Leaning Virgin of Albert, France, A WW1 legend Photograph
Stock photograph, Albert, Picardy, France. Golden Virgin atop steeple of Basilica of Notre Dame de Brebieres after being hit by German shellfire

Outdoor sculptures in France
Statues in France
19th-century sculptures
20th-century sculptures
Religious sculptures
Catholic sculpture
Statues of the Madonna and Child